Kris McGaha (born February 6, 1966) is an American actress, comedian, and television program hostess.  McGaha appeared on MTV's Loveline television show, co-hosting with Adam Carolla and Dr. Drew Pinsky.

Biography
McGaha started her career as a 16-year-old performer and stand up comedian at Houston's Comedy Workshop.  Her big break was co-hosting 65 episodes of MTV's Loveline.  In addition to hosting, Kris did sketch work on The Tonight Show with Jay Leno, Later, and guest-starred on Curb Your Enthusiasm. She also appeared on various hidden camera shows, including Invasion of Hidden Cameras, Spy TV and a hidden-camera segment (relating to "dihydrogen monoxide") on Penn & Teller: Bullshit!.

Credits

Film
Nobody's Perfect (2004)
Radio Free Steve (2000) - Ragina
The Curve (1998) - Renee
Strippers Pole (2002) - Host
Following Tildy (2002) - Tildy

Television
"Dirty Jobs"
"Invasion of Hidden Cameras" - Host
"Penn & Teller: Bullshit!" - H2O Petitioner
"Curb Your Enthusiasm" - Diane Keaton's Assistant
"Later" - Sketch Performer
"The Tonight Show with Jay Leno" - Sketch Performer
"Loveline" - Co-Host
"Ask Rita" - Herself

References

External links
McGaha's Official Site

TV Guide

1966 births
Living people
People from Oswego, New York